XHRT-FM (95.3 MHz) is a Spanish-language radio station that serves the Reynosa, Tamaulipas (Mexico) / McAllen Texas (USA) border area.

External links

 www.radioramareynosa.com
 raiostationworld.com; Radio stations serving the Rio Grande Valley

References

Radio stations in Reynosa
Radio stations established in 1988
1988 establishments in Mexico